Two Weeks in Lagos (theatrically as Duas Semanas em Lagos), is a 2019 Nigerian comedy drama film directed by Kathryn Faseghaa dn co-produced by director herself with Sarah Inya Lawal. The film stars Mawuli Gavor and Beverly Naya in the lead roles whereas Joke Silva, Jide Kosoko, Toyin Abraham and Okey Uzoeshi made supportive roles. The film revolves around Ejikeme, an investment banker who comes home from the United States with Lola's brother Charlie to invest in Nigerian businesses, but later make an affair with Lola.

The film has been shot in Lagos, Nigeria. The film made its premier on 10 October 2019. The film received mixed reviews from critics and screened worldwide.

A businessman returns home to Nigeria and falls in love with a friend's sister despite his family’s plan for him to marry a politician’s daughter.

Cast
 Mawuli Gavor as Ejikeme
 Beverly Naya as Lola
 Joke Silva as Mrs. Chukwuemeka
 Jide Kosoko as Dr. Makinde
 Toyin Abraham as Kemi
 Okey Uzoeshi as Charlie
 Deyemi Okanlawon as Joshua
 Shafy Bello as Mrs. Makinde
 Tina Mba as Sisi Toyin
 Efe Irele as Teniola
 Bambo Adebowale as Otunba Ayodeji
 Busola Dele Davids as Madam Eloho
 Lanre Toki as Efe
 Bukky Wonda as Nma 
 Patrick Nnamani as Hon. Chukwuemeka
 Cassandra Nwadiuto as Wande
 Steve Onu as Dele
 Bolu Ogodoh as Abused Child
 Tope Jegede as Pastor
 Patience Ozomanam as Party Guest
 Bolaji Rabey as Dr. Makinde's Driver
 Daniel Ezeali as Chukwuemeka Security
 James Ovat as Chukwuemeka Security
 Daniel Ezeali as Chukwuemeka Security
 Bayonle Saheed as Groom's Friend
 Lawal Aramide as Traditional Marriage MC
 Ayanlola Ayankunle as Drummer 1
 Alayande Toheeb as Drummer 2
 Joy Moses as Party Guest
 Salome Tonye as Party Guest
 Edidiong Urua as Man Trying to Kill Child

Awards and nominations

References

External links 
 

English-language Nigerian films
2019 films
2019 comedy films
Nigerian comedy-drama films
2010s English-language films